Ervin Duane Curtiss (December 27, 1861 – February 14, 1945) was a professional baseball player who played outfield in Major League Baseball in 1891.

External links

Major League Baseball outfielders
Baseball players from Michigan
Cincinnati Reds players
Washington Statesmen players
19th-century baseball players
1861 births
1945 deaths
Hastings Hustlers players
Leavenworth Soldiers players
Birmingham Maroons players
Kansas City Blues (baseball) players
Denver Grizzlies (baseball) players
Denver Mountaineers players
Charleston Seagulls players
People from Coldwater, Michigan